The Argus As 17 was an air cooled six-cylinder in-line aircraft engine designed by the German engineering company Argus Motoren in the 1930s. First demonstrated in 1934, it powered a number of competitors at the Challenge International de Tourisme that year, including the Messerschmitt Bf 108. Argus produced it in small numbers as German manufacturers like Messerschmitt preferring V-8 alternatives for their aircraft.

Design and development
The Argus As 17 was an inverted six cylinder aircraft engine in the  class that was first demonstrated in 1934. It was a development of the company's As 8 four-cylinder engine. The engine had cast aluminium heads and aluminium pistons mounted in steel cylinders and connected to a chrome-nickel steel crankshaft.

It was used to power a small number of German aircraft in the late 1930s, notably three entries to the Challenge International de Tourisme 1934, the Fieseler Fi 97, Klemm Kl 36 and Messerschmitt Bf 108. Each aircraft was entered in two variants, one powered by the Argus engine and other with the more powerful Hirth HM 8U V-8. The engine was developed in three versions. The lower powered As 17A, which was used to power the fourth prototype Bf 108, was rated at 200 hp.

The engine was produced in small numbers, never achieving serial production. Only two of the Fieseler aircraft were fitted with the engine. Klemm preferred the Hm 8U for the definitive Kl 36B. Production examples of the Bf 108 used either the HM 8U or Argus's own V-8, the As 10, the latter becoming the standard for the BF 108B.

Variants
 As 17A 
 As 17B 
 As 17 Special

Applications
 Fieseler Fi 97
 Klemm Kl 36A
 Messerschmitt Bf 108A

Specifications (As 17A)

See also

References

Notes

Bibliography
 
 
 
 
 
 
 
 
 

AS 17
Aircraft air-cooled inline piston engines
1930s aircraft piston engines
Straight-six engines